Mocis discios is a moth of the family Erebidae. It is found in the Himalaya.

References

External links
Image on Flickr

Moths described in 1844
discios